Scented Gardens for the Blind is the second album by New Zealand group Dragon released in February 1975 on Vertigo Records before they relocated to Australia in May. Scented Gardens for the Blind, along with their first album Universal Radio, is in the progressive rock genre—all subsequent albums are hard rock/pop rock. "Vermillion  Cellars" was released as a single in March and was followed by non-album singles, "Education" in May and "Star Kissed" in August but neither albums nor singles had any local chart success.

The title of New Zealand author Janet Frame's fourth novel was Scented Gardens for the Blind (1963). In 1994 the album was re-released as a CD. It was re-packaged as a double CD (with first album Universal Radio) in 2004.

Background
Dragon formed in Auckland, New Zealand, in January 1972 with a line-up that featured Todd Hunter on bass guitar, guitarist Ray Goodwin, drummer Neil Reynolds and singer/pianist Graeme Collins. All had been in various short-lived bands in Auckland, Collins is credited with using I Ching to provide the name Dragon. Their first major gig was an appearance at The Great Ngaruawahia Music Festival in early January 1973. By 1974 several personnel changes had occurred including Collins leaving, with Todd Hunter's younger brother Marc Hunter joining on vocals and Neil Storey on drums. The band recorded two progressive rock albums in their native New Zealand, Universal Radio in June 1974 and Scented Gardens for the Blind in March 1975 both on Vertigo Records. "Vermillion Cellars" was released as a single in March and was followed by a non-album single, "Education" in May. Despite being New Zealand's top live attraction by late 1974, neither albums nor singles had any local chart success, and they recruited Robert Taylor (ex-Mammal) on guitar as they searched for a raunchier pop sound. By early 1975, manager Graeme Nesbitt (ex-Mammal), who had obtained regular gigs and organized their first New Zealand tours, felt they should tackle the larger Australian market. Nesbitt was unable to travel with them to Australia—he had been arrested for selling drugs—before they relocated in May. In Australia, they released another non-album single, "Star Kissed" in August.

The title of New Zealand author Janet Frame's fourth novel was Scented Gardens for the Blind (1963). In 1994 the album was re-released as a CD. It was re-packaged by the Spanish record company Esterlla Rockera as a double CD (with first album Universal Radio) in 2005 (Catalogue Number: ER 42117).

Track listing
 Side A
"Vermillion Cellars" (Marc Hunter, Todd Hunter, Ray Goodwin) – 3:23
"La Gash Lagoon" aka "L'Gash Lagoon" (M. Hunter, T. Hunter, Goodwin) – 8:18 – Lead Vocal
"Sunburst" (Goodwin, T. Hunter, M. Hunter) – 8:33
 Side B
"Greylynn Candy" aka "Grey Lynn Candy" (Goodwin, T. Hunter) – 4:57
"Darkness" (M. Hunter, T. Hunter, Goodwin) – 4:44
"Scented Gardens for the Blind" (M. Hunter, T. Hunter, Goodwin) – 7:40

Grey Lynn is a suburb of Auckland.

Personnel
Dragon
Marc Hunter – saxophone, percussion, vocals; lead vocals (tracks 2-4, 6)
Ray Goodwin – guitars, vocals; lead vocals (tracks 1, 5)
Ivan Thompson – keyboards
Todd Hunter – bass, backing vocals
Neil Storey – drums

Additional personnel
"Josie" – background vocals
Recorded at Stebbings Studio Auckland Dec '74
Engineer – Tony Moan
Produced by Rick Shadwell for Marmalade Productions
Cover design and artwork Super Graphics Ltd

References

1975 albums
Dragon (band) albums
Progressive rock albums by Australian artists
Vertigo Records albums